Sălătruc may refer to several places in Romania:

 Sălătruc, a village in the town of Dărmănești, Bacău County
 Sălătruc, a village in Cășeiu Commune, Cluj County
 Sălătruc, a village in Blăjeni Commune, Hunedoara County
 Sălătruc, a village in Greci Commune, Mehedinţi County
 Sălătruc, a tributary of the Bistra Mărului in Caraș-Severin County
 Sălătruc, a tributary of the Jiul de Est in Hunedoara County
 Sălătruc (Someș), a tributary of the Someș in Cluj County

See also:
 Sălătrucel, a commune in Vâlcea County
 Sălătrucu, a commune in Argeș County